Tri-Valley High School may refer to:
 Tri-Valley Central School, Grahamsville, New York
 Tri-Valley High School, Cambridge, Idaho
 Tri-Valley High School, Downs, Illinois
 Tri-Valley High School, Dresden, Ohio
 Tri-Valley High School, Colton, South Dakota
 Tri-Valley School, Healy, Alaska
 Tri-Valley Junior/Senior High School, Hegins, Pennsylvania